Stefano De Mari (Genoa, 1593 - Genoa, February 25, 1674) was the 117th Doge of the Republic of Genoa and king of Corsica.

Biography 
Among the important events of his mandate, doge De Mari paid homage to the new Genoese archbishop Giambattista Spinola with whom, towards the end of the customs mandate, he had personal conflicts, as well as with the Senate itself. He left the Doge's office on April 12, 1665, but continued to serve the republic as head of the Corsican magistrate, the war magistrate and financial positions at Bank of Saint George. De Mari died in Genoa on February 25, 1674.

See also 

 Republic of Genoa
 Doge of Genoa

References 

17th-century Doges of Genoa
1593 births
1674 deaths